The T7 Armored Car was a prototype small armored car produced by Holabird Quartermaster Depot for the US Army in 1930. All six vehicles that were completed, USA W1310, USA W1311, USA W1312, USA W1313, USA W1314 and USA W1315, were 4x6 wheeled vehicles, powered by Franklin's air-cooled, 6-cylinder, gasoline engine, with a crew of four and armed with one .50 calibre machine gun supported by two .30 calibre lighter machine guns.

Design 
The T7 Armored Car was a 4x6 wheeled armored car. It was powered by a Franklin 6-cylinder, air-cooled, gasoline engine. It was equipped with one  M2 Browning machine gun and two  M1919 machine guns and was operated by a crew of 4.

Production 
The T7 was produced by the Holabird Quartermaster Depot. Only six vehicles were completed, which were labeled USA W1310, USA W1311, USA W1312, USA W1313, USA W1314 and USA W1315 respectively. One of the chassis produced was converted to a T6 Armored Car.

References

 http://www.warwheels.net/T7ArmoredCarINDEX.html
 Encyclopedia of Armoured Cars Duncan Crow and Robert J. Icks
 Searching for Perfection: An Encyclopedia of U.S. Army T-Series Vehicle Development (1925–1958) David R. Haugh

Armoured cars of the interwar period
World War II armored fighting vehicles of the United States
Reconnaissance vehicles
Studebaker vehicles
Armoured cars of the United States
Military vehicles introduced in the 1930s